Appointment for Murder is a 1951 Italian crime melodrama film drama directed by Baccio Bandini.

Plot 
A woman is found dead in the atrium of a Roman building. In that same building lives the police commissioner Pietrangeli, in charge of the investigations, with his daughter Silvia. It soon turns out that Manni, the new tenant of the building, was the husband of the dead woman. The couple had been separated for some time, but the woman kept asking him for money. The man tries to exonerate himself, but the alleged alibi cannot be revealed, in fact Manni has for some time now formed a bond with Silvia who has never had the courage to speak with her father. Cornered, the girl confesses and runs away with the man but she is tracked down thanks to the help of Giorgio, another tenant. During a tough confrontation, the police arrive who had been alerted by an anonymous phone call. Thanks to this phone call from a night club, the commissioner will be able to discover the identity of the murderer and withdraw the resignation he had submitted due to the delicate situation in which he found himself.

Cast
 Umberto Spadaro as Detective Pietrangeli
 Delia Scala as Silvia Pietrangeli
 Andrea Bosic as Aldo Manni
 Marco Vicario as Giorgio Morelli
 Natale Cirino as Palermo
 Dorian Gray as Vandina
  Angelo Maggio 
 
 Alma De Río
 Dina Perbellini
 Amina Pirani Maggi
 Diana Veneziani
 Maria Zanoli

References

External links
 

1950s Italian-language films
1951 films
1951 crime drama films
Italian crime drama films
Italian black-and-white films
1950s Italian films